Conrad Moser, Jr., (April 28, 1835July 4, 1903) was a Swiss American immigrant, lawyer, and Republican politician.  He served two years in the Wisconsin State Assembly, representing Buffalo County.

Biography
Moser was born on April 28, 1835, in Switzerland' Canton of Zurich. He moved to Alma, Wisconsin in 1855.

He was first married to Verena Dunkel. They had four children before her death in 1869. Moser later married Margaret Theisen. They had five children. After moving to California, he was arrested for burglary in 1900, but the charge was reduced to disturbing the peace. Moser died in Fruitvale, California, on July 4, 1903.

Career
Moser was appointed Clerk of Buffalo County, Wisconsin, in 1861 and was elected to the position in 1862 and 1864. He served in the Assembly from 1867 to 1868. In 1871, Moser ran for the Wisconsin State Senate, losing to Orlando Brown. Later, he was elected Buffalo County Judge in 1877 and 1879. He was a Republican.

References

External links

Swiss emigrants to the United States
People from Alma, Wisconsin
Republican Party members of the Wisconsin State Assembly
Wisconsin state court judges
County clerks in Wisconsin
1835 births
1903 deaths
19th-century American politicians
19th-century American judges
Burials at Holy Cross Cemetery (Colma, California)